The 1990 480 km of Mexico City was the ninth and final round of the 1990 World Sportscar Championship season, taking place at Autodromo Hermanos Rodriguez, Mexico.  It took place on October 7, 1990.

Official results
Class winners in bold.  Cars failing to complete 75% of the winner's distance marked as Not Classified (NC).

† - #1 Team Sauber Mercedes was disqualified for using more than its allowed amount of fuel.

Statistics
 Pole Position - #3 Silk Cut Jaguar - 1:20.626
 Fastest Lap - #2 Team Sauber Mercedes - 1:23.250
 Average Speed - 172.19 km/h

External links
 WSPR-Racing - 1990 Mexico City results

Mexico City
Mexico City
6 Hours of Mexico
October 1990 events in Mexico
October 1990 sports events in North America